Bradybaenus is a genus of beetles in the family Carabidae, containing the following species:

 Bradybaenus cephalotes Basilewsky 
 Bradybaenus czeppeli Facchini & Sciaky, 2004
 Bradybaenus festivus Dejean, 1828 
 Bradybaenus halli Basilewsky, 1946 
 Bradybaenus neavei Basilewsky, 1946 
 Bradybaenus obscurus Basilewsky, 1984 
 Bradybaenus opulentus Boheman, 1848 
 Bradybaenus oxyomus Chaudoir, 1843 
 Bradybaenus periphanus Basilewsky, 1951 
 Bradybaenus perrieri Jeannel, 1948  
 Bradybaenus plumbeus Basilewsky, 1948 
 Bradybaenus puncticollis Burgeon, 1936 
 Bradybaenus robustus Facchini & Sciaky, 2004
 Bradybaenus scalaris Olivier, 1808

References

Harpalinae